Damon Ireland Thomas (1875-1955) was an American stage performer, newspaper columnist, and theater manager. An influential film critic, he wrote for The Chicago Defender in 1920s, reviewing Black film and events at African American theaters.

Thomas managed the successful Lincoln Theater in Charleston, South Carolina, which served African American audiences from 1922 until his death in 1955. He also managed the Bijou Theater in Tampa, Florida and another theater in Atlanta, Georgia.

References

American film critics
American columnists
American theatre managers and producers
African-American writers
1875 births
1955 deaths
20th-century African-American people